Founded in 1873, Old Blues RFC is an English rugby union club. As of the 20/21 season the 1st XV competes in RFU Surrey 2 and the 2nd XV competes in Surrey Combination 1 North.  Both sides play home matches in Motspur Park, South West London.

The club welcomes players from all over London and Surrey operating three senior teams during the season and a Vets (35+) team on select weekends. During the off season the club tours annually and enters several 7's tournaments in the Surrey and South London area.

The Old Blues have recently invested heavily in new playing and social facilities, with a balcony overlooking the pitches completed in 2022. With some of the best pitches and facilities outside of the national league Old Blues are looking to expand and grow to meet their potential.

Training is on Wednesdays 19:30 - 21:00. With regular guest coaches from across professional game.

History

Originally composed of former pupils of Christ's Hospital (known as "Old Blues"), Old Blues Rugby was founded two years after the Rugby Football Union itself and the year after the very first Oxford University vs. Cambridge University Varsity Match was played. This makes the Club one of the oldest clubs in the World.  The first match was played in November 1873 against the Christ's Hospital 1st XV, on a field in Palmer's Green. The School Won.

Club honours
Surrey 1 champions: 1989–90
London 3 South West champions: 1990–91
Surrey 3 champions: 2008–09
Surrey Bowl winners: 2009
Surrey 2 champions (2): 2009–10, 2016–17

External links 
 

English rugby union teams
Christ's Hospital